Epiperipatus marajoara is a species of velvet worm in the family Peripatidae. The males of this species have 27 pairs of legs; females have 31 pairs. The type locality is in Pará state in Brazil.

References 

Onychophorans of tropical America
Onychophoran species
Animals described in 2018